Mimeresia drucei, the Druce's harlequin, is a butterfly in the family Lycaenidae. It is found in Nigeria, Cameroon, the Republic of the Congo, the Democratic Republic of the Congo and Uganda. The habitat consists of forests.

Subspecies
 Mimeresia drucei drucei (southern Cameroon, Congo, Democratic Republic of the Congo)
 Mimeresia drucei owerri Stempffer, 1961 (eastern Nigeria)
 Mimeresia drucei ugandae (Stempffer, 1954) (Uganda: west to the Bwamba Valley, Democratic Republic of the Congo: Haut-Uele, Tshopo, Tshuapa and Sankuru)

References

Butterflies described in 1954
Poritiinae